Stephen Simmons may refer to:

Stephen Simmons (hung 1830), last case of capital punishment in Michigan under state law
Stephen Simmons (footballer) (born 1982), Scottish footballer
Stephen Simmons (boxer) (born 1984), Scottish boxer

See also
Stephen Simmons House, a historic home built 1818 located at Hounsfield in Jefferson County, New York